Jean Frédéric Sarah (born 26 February 1998) is a Mauritian international footballer who plays for Quatre Bornes as a midfielder.

Career
Born in Quatre Bornes, he has played club football for Quatre Bornes and Cercle de Joachim.

He made his international debut for Mauritius in 2017.

References

1998 births
Living people
Mauritian footballers
Mauritius international footballers
AS Quatre Bornes players
Cercle de Joachim SC players
Association football midfielders